Frederick Appleton Schaus (June 30, 1925 – February 10, 2010) was an American basketball player, head coach and athletic director for the West Virginia University Mountaineers, player for the National Basketball Association's Fort Wayne Pistons and New York Knicks, general manager and head coach for the Los Angeles Lakers, head coach of Purdue University basketball, and a member of the NCAA Basketball Committee. He was born in Newark, Ohio.

College career

Schaus played basketball at West Virginia, where he earned the record of first to score 1,000 career points (1,009). He was also selected to the All-American team in 1949.

Pro career
Schaus left West Virginia to join the Fort Wayne Pistons in the 1949–1950 season. He scored 14.3 points a game and a year later scored a career-best 15.3 points a game. He was selected to play in the first NBA All-Star Game and scored eight points for the West. However, he only averaged 14.1 points per game in 1952, and then in 1953 it dropped to 10.1 points per game.

He was traded to the New York Knicks halfway through the 1954 season and ended his NBA career that season with 7.1 points per game average.

NBA career statistics

Regular season

Playoffs

College coaching career

West Virginia

After his retirement from the NBA, Schaus returned to his alma mater to coach the Mountaineers. In his first season, he led the Mountaineers to a 19–11 mark and an NCAA tournament appearance. In the next five seasons, he posted an amazing 127–26 (.831) record, which included five consecutive NCAA tournament berths. He led WVU to the NCAA finals in 1959, but lost to Pete Newell's California team, 71–70.

Purdue

After leaving NBA coaching and management in 1972, he returned to the college ranks to coach at Purdue University, taking over for George King. He held a 104–60 overall record as the Boilermaker's head coach, while leading them to the 1974 NIT Championship and a berth in the 1977 NCAA tournament. He then owned the distinction of being the only coach to reach the NIT finals, NCAA finals, and the NBA Finals.

At Purdue, Schaus was the successor to George King, who was Schaus' successor at West Virginia.

After 1981, Schaus returned to WVU to serve as the athletic director.

Professional coaching/management career

Los Angeles Lakers

After the 1960 season, he left college coaching for the Los Angeles Lakers and reunited with his former WVU star, Jerry West. Schaus guided the Lakers to seven consecutive playoff appearances, including 4 Western Conference Championships in 5 years (1962, 1963, 1965 and 1966) then in 1967 he moved to the front office to become the Lakers GM. He rebuilt the Lakers, eventually winning the  1972 NBA title.

Head coaching record

College

Professional

|-
| style="text-align:left;"|LAL
| style="text-align:left;"|
|79||36||43||.456|| style="text-align:center;"|2nd in Western||12||6||6||.500
| style="text-align:center;"|Lost in Western Div. Finals
|-
| style="text-align:left;"|LAL
| style="text-align:left;"|
|80||54||26||.675|| style="text-align:center;"|1st in Western||13||7||6||.538
| style="text-align:center;"|Lost in NBA Finals
|- class="sortbottom"
|-
| style="text-align:left;"|LAL
| style="text-align:left;"|
|80||53||27||.663|| style="text-align:center;"|1st in Western||13||6||7||.462
| style="text-align:center;"|Lost in NBA Finals
|- class="sortbottom"
|-
| style="text-align:left;"|LAL
| style="text-align:left;"|
|80||42||38||.525|| style="text-align:center;"|3rd in Western||5||2||3||.400
| style="text-align:center;"|Lost in Western Div. Semifinals
|- class="sortbottom"
|-
| style="text-align:left;"|LAL
| style="text-align:left;"|
|80||49||31||.613|| style="text-align:center;"|1st in Western||11||5||6||.455
| style="text-align:center;"|Lost in NBA Finals
|- class="sortbottom"
|-
| style="text-align:left;"|LAL
| style="text-align:left;"|
|80||45||35||.563|| style="text-align:center;"|1st in Western||14||7||7||.500
| style="text-align:center;"|Lost in NBA Finals
|- class="sortbottom"
|-
| style="text-align:left;"|LAL
| style="text-align:left;"|
|81||36||45||.444|| style="text-align:center;"|3rd in Western||3||0||3||.000
| style="text-align:center;"|Lost in Western Div. Semifinals
|- class="sortbottom"
| style="text-align:left;"|Career
| ||560||315||245||.563|| ||71||33||38||.465

Personal life
He is the father of Southern Conference Commissioner and former Ohio University and Wichita State University athletic director Jim Schaus.

Schaus died in Morgantown, West Virginia, on February 10, 2010. He was 84.

See also
 List of NCAA Division I Men's Final Four appearances by coach

References

1925 births
2010 deaths
American men's basketball coaches
American men's basketball players
American people of German descent
Basketball players at the 1959 Pan American Games
Basketball coaches from Ohio
Basketball players from Ohio
College men's basketball head coaches in the United States
Fort Wayne Pistons draft picks
Fort Wayne Pistons players
Los Angeles Lakers head coaches
Medalists at the 1959 Pan American Games
National Basketball Association All-Stars
National Basketball Association executives
New York Knicks players
Pan American Games gold medalists for the United States
Pan American Games medalists in basketball
Purdue Boilermakers men's basketball coaches
Small forwards
Sportspeople from Newark, Ohio
West Virginia Mountaineers athletic directors
West Virginia Mountaineers men's basketball coaches
West Virginia Mountaineers men's basketball players